Erhart is an unincorporated community in Medina County, in the U.S. state of Ohio.

History
A post office was established at Erhart in 1873, and remained in operation until 1943.

References

Unincorporated communities in Medina County, Ohio
Unincorporated communities in Ohio